The Bangkok Critics Assembly Awards is a film award based in Thailand. It is given by the Bangkok Critics Assembly, an association of professional film critics, to local feature film productions on an annual basis. The first ceremony was held in 1991 for films released in 1990, with awards in eleven categories. Two more categories and a lifetime achievement award have since been added. The awards are decided by a regular panel of judges, and is considered one of the most prestigious in the Thai cinema industry. The ceremony is usually low-key and informal, and is often compared and contrasted to the red-carpet Suphannahong National Film Awards.

References

Thai film awards
1991 establishments in Thailand